Obama  is a genus of land planarians from South America. It contains several species adapted to human-disturbed environments, including the only invasive land planarian native to the Neotropical realm, Obama nungara, which has been accidentally introduced in Europe.

Description 
The genus Obama is characterized by having a leaf-shaped body. The hundreds of eyes distributed along the body are of two types: monolobulated, which are simple and circular, and trilobulated, which have three lobes.

The copulatory apparatus of Obama has a protrusible penis occupying the entire male atrium or most of it. Morphologically the genus can be divided in two subgroups depending on the shape of the penis papilla, which may be symmetrical or asymmetrical. The group with an asymmetrical penis papilla includes 10 species (O. anthropophilla, O. carbayoi, O. carrierei, O. decidualis, O. josefi, O. ladislavii, O. marmorata, O. nungara, O. otavioi and O. ruiva) and seems to form a monophyletic clade within Obama. On the other hand, the group with a symmetrical penis papilla is paraphyletic, indicating that this is the ancestral state within the genus.

Etymology 
The name Obama is formed by a composition of the Tupi words oba (leaf) and ma (animal), being a reference to the body shape of species in this genus.

Species 

There are 45 species assigned to the genus Obama, making it the largest genus in the subfamily Geoplaninae:

Obama allandra Marques, Rossi, Valiati & Leal-Zanchet, 2018
Obama anthropophila Amaral, Leal-Zanchet & Carbayo, 2015
Obama apeva (Froehlich, 1959)
Obama apiguara Oliveira, Almeida & Carbayo, 2020
Obama applanata (Graff, 1899)
Obama argus (Graff, 1899)
Obama assu (Froehlich, 1959)
Obama aureolineata Iturralde & Leal-Zanchet, 2021
Obama autumna Iturralde & Leal-Zanchet, 2021
Obama baptistae (Leal-Zanchet & Oliveira, 2012)
Obama braunsi (Graff, 1899)
Obama burmeisteri (Schultze & Müller, 1857)
Obama carbayoi (Oliveira & Leal-Zanchet, 2012)
Obama carinata (Riester, 1938)
Obama carrierei (Graff, 1897)
Obama catharina (Hyman, 1957)
Obama decidualis Amaral & Leal-Zanchet, 2015
Obama dictyonota (Riester, 1938)
Obama divae (Marcus, 1951)
Obama eudoxiae (Ogren & Kawakatsu, 1990)
Obama eudoximariae (Ogren & Kawakatsu, 1990)
Obama evelinae (Marcus, 1951)
Obama ferussaci (Graff, 1897)
Obama ficki (Amaral & Leal-Zanchet, 2012)
Obama fryi (Graff, 1899)
Obama glieschi (Froehlich, 1959)
Obama itatiayana (Schirch, 1929)
Obama josefi (Carbayo & Leal-Zanchet, 2001)
Obama ladislavii (Graff, 1899)
Obama leticiae Iturralde & Leal-Zanchet, 2021
Obama livia (E. M. Froehlich, 1955)
Obama maculatentis Negrete, Gira & Brusa, 2019
Obama maculipunctata Rossi, Amaral, Ribeiro, Cauduro, Fick, Valiati & Leal-Zanchet, 2015
Obama marmorata (Schultze & Müller, 1857)
Obama metzi (Graff, 1899)
Obama nungara Carbayo, Álvarez-Presas, Jones & Riutort, 2016 
Obama otavioi Carbayo, 2016
Obama poca (Froehlich, 1958)
Obama polyophthalma (Graff, 1899)
Obama riesteri (Froehlich, 1955)
Obama rufiventris (Schultze & Müller, 1857)
Obama ruiva (E. M. Froehlich, 1972)
Obama schubarti (Froehlich, 1958)
Obama tribalis Marques, Rossi, Valiati & Leal-Zanchet, 2018
Obama trigueira (E. M. Froehlich, 1955)

Phylogeny 

The genus Obama was erected after a study of molecular phylogeny with the subfamily Geoplaninae revealed that the genus Geoplana, originally containing more than a hundred species, was polyphyletic. One of the monophyletic clades revealed by the study was separate from Geoplana as the new genus Obama. All species within the new genus share a similar morphology, including the leaf-shaped body, the presence of a permanent penis papilla, ovovitelline ducts entering the female atrium dorsally and dorsal eyes of two types: mono- and trilobulated.

The sister-group of Obama seems to be the genus Cratera, which has a very similar appearance but lacks trilobulated eyes.

The following phylogenetic tree shows the relationship of several species of Obama after several molecular studies:

References 

Geoplanidae
Rhabditophora genera